Dennis Bouman (born May 3, 1970), known professionally as Def Rhymz, is a Surinamese-Dutch rapper best known for his humouristic raps. He was the first Dutch rapper ever to hit the number 1 spot on the Dutch charts, with two songs: Doekoe in 1999 and Schudden in 2001.

Bouman went on to collaborate with the otherwise English-language trio Postmen on a cover-version of De Bom, the chart-topping 1982-hit by pop/reggae-band Doe Maar for inclusion on a tribute-album.

Besides performing, Bouman also works as a head-chef.

See also
 List of Dutch hip hop musicians

References 

Living people
1970 births
Dutch rappers
Dutch people of Surinamese descent